3140 may refer to:

In general
 A.D. 3140, a year in the 4th millennium CE
 3140 BC, a year in the 4th millennium BCE
 3140, a number in the 3000 (number) range

Other uses
 3140 Stellafane, an asteroid in the Asteroid Belt, the 3140th asteroid registered
 Hawaii Route 3140, a state highway
 Louisiana Highway 3140, a state highway
 Texas Farm to Market Road 3140, a state highway

See also